Gaseosa refers to a soft drink with lemon flavor made by Ciego Montero in Cuba and La Casera in Spain. It tastes similar to Sprite and 7 Up.

See also
Arriete-Ciego Montero

References

Cuban brands
Cuban drinks
Soft drinks